Lee Jin-wook (Korean: 이진욱; born September 16, 1981) is a South Korean actor. He is best known for his leading role in the romance series Glass Castle, the time-traveling series Nine (2013), romance series The Time We Were Not in Love and I Need Romance 2012, crime thriller series Voice (seasons 2–3), a Netflix apocalyptic horror series Sweet Home and a supporting role in the comedy film Miss Granny.

Career

2000–2009: Education and career beginnings
Lee Jin-wook studied Environmental Engineering at Cheongju University and made a switch for acting. He began his career in the entertainment industry modelling in commercials. His first minor acting roles consist of General Hospital The Movie : A Thousand Days and the 2004 South Korean film Once Upon a Time in High School starring Kwon Sang-woo, Ahn Nae-sang, Joo Jin-mo, and Seo Dong-won. Lee landed his first television acting role in the TV Movie, Bad Girl, in 2004 and later scored other roles in the television dramas Alone in Love, Someday, Smile Again, and Resurrection starring Uhm Tae-woong. In 2006, Lee starred in the South Korean film A Dirty Carnival.

Lee achieved commercial success and Hallyu star status after his portrayal as the second male lead in the television series Air City where he went on to date his co-star Choi Ji-woo for three years. Lee continued to land lead roles playing the president's son in Formidable Rivals, a plastic surgeon in the series Before and After, and a newly married chaebol in Glass Castle. He also made a cameo in The Road Home.

2009–2016: Military enlistment and further success
Lee then served his two-year mandatory military service from May 6, 2009, to March 7, 2011, at the Defense Media Agency of the Ministry of National Defense.

After his military discharge in 2011, Lee starred in his comeback project, Myung-wol the Spy where he played a North Korean agent. He then went on to star in the romantic comedy drama I Need Romance 2012 alongside Jung Yu-mi. Lee then landed his most high-profile role yet as a TV anchor named Park Sun-woo in the time-traveling romance Nine alongside Jo Yoon-hee. 

After receiving positive reception from his role in Nine, Lee starred in a cinematic film for the first time in 7 years in the 2014 comedy Miss Granny. He then proceeded to land his first major big-screen role in the 2014 action film The Target, a remake of the 2010 French action movie Point Blank. After that, 
Lee then reunited with the writer and director of Nine in the television series The Three Musketeers, a period drama set during the Joseon era where he played Crown Prince Sohyeon. He continued to star in big-screen films, fantasy romantic comedy The Beauty Inside and the time-travel romance crime Time Renegade. Lee's appearance in The Beauty Inside as Woo-jin garnered headline attention in South Korea at the time of its cinematic release as the scene unveiling him as one of Woo-jin's reincarnations left all female audience members in the theatre exclaiming in awe of his appearance. In South Korean pop culture, it is considered one of the top legendary character unveilings in South Korean cinema. He then returned to the small screen with the South Korean remake of the Taiwanese drama In Time with You, The Time We Were Not in Love alongside Ha Ji-won.
In 2016, Lee starred in the crime drama, Goodbye Mr. Black, based on the manga of the same name.

2017–present: Transition in leading roles and reinvention
In 2017, Lee was cast in three films; indie films A Tiger in Winter and Road to Utah; and romance thriller High Society.

In 2018, Lee returned to the small screen with successful crime dramas Return, and Voice season 2. The premiere of the second season of Voice set the record for the highest premiere viewership rating for an OCN original drama series. The second season of Voice continued on from the success of the first season, even exceeding first season ratings despite its shorter run. Due to its major success, Voice was picked up for a third season with Lee reprising his role as Do Kang-woo. The third season of Voice continued to be just as successful as the second season.

In 2019, Lee signed an exclusive contract with BH Entertainment which houses many other top high-profile South Korean actors.

In 2020, Lee starred in Netflix original series Sweet Home, a webtoon-based drama about a secluded teen who lives cooped up in his room, scarred from memories of school violence, and experiences creepy events after moving to an apartment following the loss of his family. It premiered on Netflix Korea on December 18, 2020.

On March 17, 2021, tvN released the full main cast for the drama, Bulgasal: Immortal Souls,  a fantasy drama that revolves around two characters. The first is a woman who has gone through several reincarnations over the course of 600 years and remembers all of her past lives, and the second is a man who has lived for over 600 years as a bulgasal—a mythical creature that feeds off human blood and is cursed with immortality. Lee starred as Dan Hwal, who used to be human 600 years ago, but turns into a bulgasal during the Joseon dynasty while working as a military official and completing a mission to erase the remnants of the previous dynasty. This drama aired from December 18, 2021 to February 6, 2022 on tvN and was also available for streaming on Netflix.

On April 22, 2021, CJ E&M and TVING revealed the full star-studded cast for the film, A Year-End Medley. The film centers around various people who come to Hotel Emrose, each with stories of their own, building new relationships. A Year-End Medley is directed by Kwak Jae-yong with notable works such as My Sassy Girl and The Classic, and produced by Hive Media Corp. of Inside Men, The Man Standing Next, and Deliver Us from Evil. Lee starred as Lee Jin-Ho, a plastic surgeon who appears at the hotel’s lounge every Saturday night awaiting his fateful love. Filming began on April 19, 2021 and the film was released in theaters and through TVING on December 29, 2021.

On December 8, 2021, it was revealed that Lee would take on the role of Seo Joon-hyung in the KakaoTV original web drama, 'Welcome to Wedding Hell', alongside Lee Yeon-hee. 'Welcome to Wedding Hell' explores a couple in their thirties preparing for marriage who come to terms with the true realities of marriage during the preparations for their wedding. Lee's character, Joon-hyung, is described as a pure-hearted, idealistic groom-to-be, which causes concerns in his soon-to-be wife, Kim Na-eun (played by Lee Yeon-hee), who is a described as a realist. This marks Lee's first role in a romantic comedy since 2015 in 'The Time We Were Not in Love'. The web drama aired from May 23 to June 15, 2022 on streaming services, KakaoTV and Netflix. 

On June 15, 2022, Netflix confirmed that Lee would reprise his role as Sang Wook in seasons 2 and 3 of 'Sweet Home'.

On October 18, 2022, OSEN News reports that Lee will make a special appearance on upcoming Netflix Original, 'The Girl Downstairs' alongside with Bae Suzy and Yang Se-jong.

Personal life

Relationships 
After starring together in the 2007 South Korean television series, Air City, Lee went on to date his co-star Choi Ji-woo for three years from 2009 to 2011. The pair cited excessive public and media attention as one of the reasons for their split.

In May 2014, Lee was spotted out several times with actress Gong Hyo-jin and it was later confirmed by both their agencies that the pair were dating. However, three months after the confirmation of their dating news, it was revealed that the pair had broken-up.

Filmography

Film

Television series

Web series

Variety show

Music video

Awards and nominations

References

External links
 

 LEE JIN WOOK at BH Entertainment 
 
 

People from Cheongju
21st-century South Korean male actors
South Korean male television actors
South Korean male film actors
South Korean male models
1981 births
Living people
Cheongju University alumni